Sykes is an unincorporated community in Clarke County, Mississippi, United States.

A post office operated under the name Sykes from 1903 to 1915.

References

Unincorporated communities in Clarke County, Mississippi
Unincorporated communities in Mississippi